Harald Ove Hennum (29 May 1928 – 14 October 1993) was a Norwegian footballer who played as a forward for Frigg and Skeid. He was one of Norway's greatest football profiles in the 1950s.

Club career
Hennum started his career playing for Frigg where he had a total of three spells. As a player at Skeid, Hennum won the Norwegian Cup with Skeid four times, in 1954, 1955, 1956 and 1958.

International career
For the Norway national team, Hennum played 43 matches and scored 25 goals, thereby placing third on Norway's all-time top goalscorer list. He scored four goals in a 1958 friendly match against GDR.

Honours
Skeid
Norwegian Cup: 1954, 1955, 1956, 1958

Individual
Norwegian top division top scorer: 1954–55, 1957–58

References

External links
 

1928 births
1993 deaths
Norwegian footballers
Association football forwards
Norway international footballers
Eliteserien players
Frigg Oslo FK players
Skeid Fotball players
Footballers from Oslo